Sea of Dreams may refer to:

Music

Albums
 Sea of Dreams (1958 album), a 1958 album by Nelson Riddle
 The Private Sea of Dreams, a 1967 album by Ennio Morricone
 Sea of Dreams (1995 album), a 1995 album by Godgory
 The Sea of Dreams (1998 album), a 1998 album by Davy Spillane, featuring Sinéad O'Connor

Songs
 "Sea of Dreams" (Misia song), a 2006 single by Misia
 "Sea of Dreams", a song from the 1969 album Idle Race
 "Sea of Dreams", a song by Captain Hollywood Project from the 1995 album Animals or Human
 "Sea of Dreams", a song by Orphanage from the 1997 EP At the Mountains of Madness
 "Everything I Need (Sea Of Dreams)", a 2008 single by Jan Johnston
 "Sea of Dreams", a song by Battle Beast from the 2015 album Unholy Savior
 "Sea of Dreams", a song by Oberhofer on the 2017 soundtrack album for BoJack Horseman

Other uses
 Mare Desiderii, an area on the far side of the Moon
 Sea of Dreams, a 1930 U.S. film by Warren Newcombe, see List of avant-garde films before 1930

See also 
 The Dreaming Sea, a 1996 album by Karen Matheson